William Cattell Trimble (died June 24, 1996 Brooklandville, Maryland) was an American diplomat who began his career as a vice consul in Seville, Spain in 1931 and finished it in 1968 as Deputy Assistant Secretary of State for African Affairs.  He was the United States Ambassador to Cambodia from 1959 until 1962.,

A Baltimore native, Trimble graduated from the Gilman School in 1926 and Princeton University in 1930.

While working at the embassy in Paris in the era of Kristallnacht, he needed to arrange for as many American tourists to return as possible as well as relocate German Jews who had relocated to France.

References

1996 deaths
Ambassadors of the United States to Cambodia
Gilman School alumni
People from Baltimore
Princeton University alumni
United States Department of State officials
Year of birth missing